Metro India is an English-language daily newspaper being published in Hyderabad, Telangana. It is available in the Indian State of Telangana.

History
The newspaper was founded in 2013 by CL Rajam who previously launched a Telugu daily newspaper, Namasthe Telangana. After the formation of Telangana State, he bequeathed Namasthe Telangana and started the daily under Intercontinental Digital Pvt ltd.

Editions
The news paper publishes editions for Hyderabad , Warangal, Khammam, Nizamabad, Nalgonda, Karimnagar, Mahabubnagar and other parts of Telangana.

References

External links
 Official site
 Epaper

English-language newspapers published in India
Newspapers published in Hyderabad
Newspapers established in 2013
Daily newspapers published in India
2013 establishments in Andhra Pradesh